The Tropiduridae are a family of iguanid lizards. The family is sometimes considered a subfamily, Tropidurinae. The subfamily is native to South America, including the islands of Trinidad and the Galápagos. Commonly known as neotropical ground lizards, most are ground-dwelling animals, and the subfamily includes some lizards adapted to relatively cold climates, including those of the  Andes mountains and Tierra del Fuego. Several species give birth to live young.

A 2021 study described a novel escutcheon-type generation gland ('α-gland') in tropidurines, found in at least 39 species. This gland is believed to be the main potential source of semiochemicals in this group indicating its importance in chemical signalling, an essential component of the communication system of lizards.

Genera
The family Tropiduridae contains the following eight genera.
Eurolophosaurus 
Microlophus  – lava lizards and Pacific iguanas (sometimes in Tropidurus)
Plica 
Stenocercus  – whorltail iguanas
Strobilurus 
Tropidurus  (including Platynotus, Tapinurus)
Uracentron  – thornytail iguanas (sometimes in Tropidurus)
Uranoscodon

References

External links

Further reading
Bell T (1843). The Zoology of the Voyage of H.M.S. Beagle Under the Command of Captain Fitzroy, R.N., during the years 1832 to 1836. Edited and Superintended by Charles Darwin ... Naturalist to the Expedition. Part V. Reptiles. London: Smith, Elder and Company. vi + 51 pp. + Plates 1-20. (Tropiduridae, new family, p. 1). (in English and Latin).

 
Lizard families
Taxa named by Thomas Bell (zoologist)